Oliver Kizito (born 14 February 1988) is a Kenyan rugby union player, currently playing for the  in the 2022 Currie Cup First Division. His preferred position is lock.

Professional career
Kizito represented Simba XV in the 2014 Vodacom Cup. He was then named in the  squad for the 2022 Currie Cup First Division.< Kizito is a Kenyan international in both 15-a-side and sevens.

References

External links
itsrugby.co.uk Profile

1988 births
Living people
Rugby union locks
Kenyan rugby union players
Kenya international rugby union players
Simba XV players
Simbas players